James Mayo may refer to:

 Stephen Coulter (born 1914), English writer, and, as James Mayo, the author of several spy and adventure thrillers
 James E. Mayo (1936–1995), American exhibition specialist